The Masada College is an independent Jewish co-educational early learning, primary and secondary day school, located in , on the upper North Shore of Sydney, New South Wales, Australia. Masada College is Australia’s first Jewish international co-educational school. Enrolment is also open to non- Jewish students.

History
In 1962, a group of Jewish parents on Sydney’s North Shore founded the North Shore Jewish Kindergarten. In 1966, Masada Primary School was opened. The school began with 14 students housed on the premises of the North Shore Synagogue in Lindfield. Within a few years, Masada Primary School expanded to over 50 students.

A high school was established in 1982, and the following year, it was relocated to the newly-purchased campus in St Ives (now known as the Michael Faktor Campus). Initially, the high school had 60 students in years 7 and 8, and an early learning center was also created. In addition, the campus became home to the new Kehillat Masada Synagogue, and in 1990 the Rachael and Reuben Pelerman Centre was added to the campus. The Sir Asher Joel Synagogue was extended and upgraded in 2003, along with the campus’s resource center.

In 2014, Masada College consolidated its operations on one campus in St Ives, with all operations on the Michael Faktor Campus.

Academic achievement
Masada College consistently ranks in the top 150 schools in New South Wales.

In late 2008 the NSW Board of Studies found that in 2008 29.5% of students from Masada who sat the HSC did so with some form of special consideration. A member of the Board of Studies' committee for processing special applications noted the ease with which schools and parents could arrange medical certification of minor ailments and use the certifications to gain special dispensations for students sitting the competitive final examinations.

Notable alumni
Gavin Fingleson, South African-born Australian, Olympic silver medalist baseball player
Adam Kellerman, Paralympic wheelchair tennis player

See also

 List of non-government schools in New South Wales

References

External links
 http://www.masada.nsw.edu.au/

Jewish primary schools in Sydney
Jewish secondary schools in Sydney
Jewish day schools
Jews and Judaism in Sydney
Junior School Heads Association of Australia Member Schools
St Ives, New South Wales
1966 establishments in Australia
Educational institutions established in 1966